Minnie Klavans (May 10, 1915 - September 19, 1999) was an American artist whose work is held by the Smithsonian Museum of American Art, the Baltimore Museum of Art, the American University Museum, among others.

Life and work

Early life 
Minnie Klavans (née Farber) was born in Garrett Park, Maryland on May 10, 1915.  She was the second child of Eastern-European Jewish immigrants, Samuel Farber (1882 -1956) and Annie Farber (née Koblen, 1877- 1943).  She had an older brother, Leon Farber (1932-2008), who was a jazz percussionist and a younger brother Melvin Farber (1925-1951), a pilot and World War II bombardier who died in a training accident.

Education 
Klavans studied at Wilson Teachers College in Washington, DC, graduating in 1935. From 1939 to 1943 she worked as a personnel officer in the War Department.

In 1951, Klavans enrolled in a silversmithing course at the YMCA and started working on design, soldering, stone-setting and other metalwork.  Her designs were intricate, complex, exacting and time-consuming.  She set up a small workshop in an unused corner in the dark musty basement of her home and worked assiduously on the many complicated phases of her creations.  Just over one year after starting her silversmithing, she entered a pin into the Smithsonian Institution's Metropolitan State Art Contest and placed first in silversmithing 1953.  She continued with metalwork for another year, entered a bracelet and again, won a first-place award in 1954.  She continued silversmithing on the side, Klavans decided to move to graphic art and painting. In 1956, she signed up for a painting class at the YMCA in Washington D.C. In 1957, she started studying at American University with Luciano Penay (formerly Luciano Pena y Lillo), then a newly hired Professor of Art.

Career 
Kavans began painting and sculpture later in life, starting her career after age 40. She exhibited in Washington DC, New York City, Madrid, and Bilbao, Spain with an exhibit that toured six Spanish cities including Bilbao, Barcelona and Valencia. Her work is largely non-representational hard edge abstract, acrylic on canvas. Klavans worked in acrylic, watercolor, and felt-tip pen on handmade paper (which she made), rice paper, canvas, linen, metal, cardboard and cloth.

In 1958, Klavans co-established a group of 11 painters who, for the next 35 years worked under the tutelage of Professor Pinay. Group 11, as it was known, held several group shows in galleries in Washington, Maryland and Virginia including the Mickelson’s Gallery and the Emerson Gallery.
 
Her work is included in the collections of the Smithsonian American Art Museum and the American University Museum.

Death 
Klavans continued to paint, draw and create multimedia works until her death from cancer at age 84.

Exhibitions and collections 

Klavans has had pieces accepted in the Corcoran Gallery of Art, the Smithsonian Museum of American Art, The National Museum of Women in the Arts,  the Baltimore Museum of Art, and the White House rotating collection.  She has had numerous one-woman shows and group shows in Washington DC, New York, and Madrid, Spain. Selected shows and collections include:

Watkins Gallery, Washington D.C. 1964 
Corcoran Gallery of Art - Juried Area Show, Washington D.C.1965
Invitational Show for Dedication of the National Bureau of Standards, Washington D.C.	1966
Mickelson Gallery (Four person show), Washington D.C.	1967
Cisneros Gallery, New York City, New York (solo show) 1967
Baltimore Museum of Art, Juried Art Show - Award Winner, Baltimore, Maryland	1967
Corcoran Gallery of Art - Juried Area Show, Washington D.C.   1967
Museum of Modern Art, Bilbao, Spain (One Woman Show)  1969
Smithsonian Institution, National Collection of Fine Arts,
White House Exhibition	1970
Mickelson Gallery - One Woman Show	1972
Baltimore Museum of Art, Baltimore Maryland	 1972 
Plum Gallery, Kensington, MD (one woman show)	1977
National Museum of Women in The Arts, Washington, DC (permanent collection and catalog) 1986
Accepted in Permanent Collection and Displayed in “Art in Washington DC in the 1960s” Exhibit   2016

Reception 
Klavan's work has been reviewed in multiple publications including Popovici, La Prensa, 1968; Washington Star, 10/26/1969; Washington Daily News, 9/13/1971; The Gallery Scene, The Evening Star, 3/13/1972; Maryland News, 3/23/1972; and the Unicorn Times 11/77.

Jo Ann Lewis wrote int The Washington Post (10/22/1977):“....The inventive Minne Klavans is showing her latest work…a series of 60-foot scrolls – some small and some huge and spectacular – all covered with brightly colored, intuited abstract signs and symbols which one “reads” by unrolling the scrolls, oriental style.”

References

1915 births
1999 deaths
20th-century American women artists